The Kern River Canyon is a canyon in Kern County, California. It is located in the Southern Sierra Nevada. 

The canyon was formed by the Kern River, and connects the Kern River Valley and southern San Joaquin Valley.  California State Route 178 (Kern Canyon Road) follows the canyon, from east of Bakersfield up to the Lake Isabella area.

References

Canyons and gorges of California
Kern River
Landforms of the Sierra Nevada (United States)
Landforms of Kern County, California
Kern River Valley